The Excellence League (a.k.a. Excellence 9 League, E9 League) is an alliance of 9 Chinese universities established in 2010.

Membership

History

Beijing Institute of Technology, Dalian University of Technology, Southeast University, Harbin Institute of Technology, South China University of Technology, Tianjin University, Tongji University and Northwestern Polytechnical University are all Project 985 National Key Universities with strong backgrounds in engineering. In order to implement the "Outline of the National Program for Medium and Long-term Reform and Development of Education (2010-2020)" and "Outline of the National Program for Medium and Long-term Talent Development (2010-2020)" in China, on 23 June 2010, the Ministry of Education of China called on these eight universities to start the "Excellent Engineer Education Program" kick-off meeting at Tianjin University to promote China's education for future engineers.

In November 2010, the eight universities mentioned above signed the "Framework Convention on the Education of Excellent Talents" at Tongji University, Shanghai, China. Since then, the League started to boost comprehensive cooperation among member universities holding the principle of Pursue Excellence and Share the Resources. On November 30, 2010, Chongqing University declared its participants in the League, which expanded the League's coverage to 9 universities. In December 2010, the League was officially called E9 League because of this.

In 2011, Hunan University participated in the E9 league activities, carried out the joint enrollment of graduate students in 10 universities using the enrollment publicity platform interchangeably, and recommended graduate students without exams between schools. However, it was not an official member and was invited to join the E9 League President's Forum regularly as an observer and dialogue partner. Now the League is still named excellence 9, which means that the total number of member universities is 9.

Policies
According to the convention signed by member universities, the cooperation among them includes:
 Explore laws and methods for educating excellent talents
 Push forward the reform of the university entrance and enrollment 
 Promote joint-education for undergraduate and postgraduate students
 Promote international cooperations 
 Cooperate in teaching, research and industrialization

The League now offers exchange programs for undergraduates. Students can choose to study in another league member as long as he or she is enrolled by one of the 10 members. In this way, all the students within these 10 universities can share educational resources.

See also
 C9 League
 Yangtze Delta Universities Alliance
 Seven Sons of National Defence

References

College and university associations and consortia in Asia
Higher education in China
Universities and colleges in China
Engineering universities and colleges in China
Professional associations based in China
Educational institutions established in 2010
2010 establishments in China